Inclusion bodies are aggregates of specific types of protein found in neurons, a number of tissue cells including red blood cells, bacteria, viruses, and plants. Inclusion bodies of aggregations of multiple proteins are also found in muscle cells affected by inclusion body myositis and hereditary inclusion body myopathy.

Inclusion bodies in neurons may be accumulated in the cytoplasm or nucleus, and are associated with many neurodegenerative diseases. 
Inclusion bodies in neurodegenerative diseases are aggregates of misfolded proteins (aggresomes) and are hallmarks of many of these diseases, including Lewy bodies in Lewy body dementias, and Parkinson's disease, neuroserpin inclusion bodies called Collins bodies in familial encephalopathy with neuroserpin inclusion bodies, inclusion bodies in Huntington's disease, Papp–Lantos bodies in multiple system atrophy, and various inclusion bodies in frontotemporal dementia including Pick bodies. Bunina bodies in motor neurons are a core feature of amyotrophic lateral sclerosis.

Other usual cell inclusions are often temporary inclusions of accumulated proteins, fats, secretory granules or other insoluble components.

Inclusion bodies are found in bacteria as particles of aggregated protein. They have a higher density than many other cell components but are porous. They typically represent sites of viral multiplication in a bacterium or a eukaryotic cell and usually consist of viral capsid proteins.
Inclusion bodies contain very little host protein, ribosomal components or DNA/RNA fragments. They often almost exclusively contain the over-expressed protein and aggregation and has been reported to be reversible. It has been suggested that inclusion bodies are dynamic structures formed by an unbalanced equilibrium between aggregated and soluble proteins of Escherichia coli. There is a growing body of information indicating that formation of inclusion bodies occurs as a result of intracellular accumulation of partially folded expressed proteins which aggregate through non-covalent hydrophobic or ionic interactions or a combination of both.

Composition
Inclusion bodies have a non-unit (single) lipid membrane. Protein inclusion bodies are classically thought to contain misfolded protein.  However, this has been contested, as green fluorescent protein will sometimes fluoresce in inclusion bodies, which indicates some resemblance of the native structure and researchers have recovered folded protein from inclusion bodies.

Mechanism of formation

When genes from one organism are expressed in another organism the resulting protein sometimes forms inclusion bodies. This is often true when large evolutionary distances are crossed:  a cDNA isolated from Eukarya for example, and expressed as a recombinant gene in a prokaryote risks the formation of the inactive aggregates of protein known as inclusion bodies. While the cDNA may properly code for a translatable mRNA, the protein that results will emerge in a foreign microenvironment. This often has fatal effects, especially if the intent of cloning is to produce a biologically active protein. For example, eukaryotic systems for carbohydrate modification and membrane transport are not found in prokaryotes.  The internal microenvironment of a prokaryotic cell (pH, osmolarity) may differ from that of the original source of the gene. Mechanisms for folding a protein may also be absent, and hydrophobic residues that normally would remain buried may be exposed and available for interaction with similar exposed sites on other ectopic proteins. Processing systems for the cleavage and removal of internal peptides would also be absent in bacteria.  The initial attempts to clone insulin in a bacterium suffered all of these deficits. In addition, the fine controls that may keep the concentration of a protein low will also be missing in a prokaryotic cell, and overexpression can result in filling a cell with ectopic protein that, even if it were properly folded, would precipitate by saturating its environment.

In neurons
Inclusion bodies are aggregates of protein associated with many neurodegenerative diseases, accumulated in the cytoplasm or nucleus of neurons. Inclusion bodies of aggregations of multiple proteins are also found in muscle cells affected by inclusion body myositis and hereditary inclusion body myopathy.

Inclusion bodies in neurodegenerative diseases are aggregates of misfolded proteins (aggresomes) and are hallmarks of many of these diseases, including Lewy bodies in Lewy body dementias, and Parkinson's disease, neuroserpin inclusion bodies called Collins bodies in familial encephalopathy with neuroserpin inclusion bodies, inclusion bodies in Huntington's disease, Papp-Lantos inclusions in multiple system atrophy, and various inclusion bodies in frontotemporal dementia including Pick bodies. Bunina bodies in motor neurons are a core feature of amyotrophic lateral sclerosis.

In red blood cells
Normally a red blood cell does not contain inclusions in the cytoplasm. However, it may be seen because of certain hematologic disorders.

There are three kinds of red blood cell inclusions:
Developmental organelles
Howell-Jolly bodies: small, round fragments of the nucleus resulting from karyorrhexis or nuclear disintegration of the late reticulocyte and stain reddish-blue with Wright's stain.
Basophilic stipplings - these stipplings are either fine or coarse, deep blue to purple staining inclusion that appears in erythrocytes on a dried Wright's stain.
Pappenheimer bodies - are siderotic granules which are small, irregular, dark-staining granules that appear near the periphery of a young erythrocyte in a Wright stain.
Polychromatophilic red cells - young red cells that no longer have nucleus but still contain some RNA.
Cabot rings - ring-like structure and may appear in erythrocytes in megaloblastic anemia or in severe anemias, lead poisoning, and in dyserythropoiesis, in which erythrocytes are destroyed before being released from the bone marrow.
Abnormal hemoglobin precipitation
Heinz bodies - round bodies, refractile inclusions not visible on a Wright's stain film. They are best identified by supravital staining with basic dyes.
Hemoglobin H inclusions - alpha thalassemia, greenish-blue inclusion bodies appear in many erythrocytes after four drops of blood is incubated with 0.5mL of Brilliant cresyl blue for 20 minutes at 37 °C.
Protozoan inclusion
Malaria
Babesia

In white blood cells
Inclusions of immunoglobulin called Russell bodies are found in atypical plasma cells. Russell bodies clump together in large numbers displacing the cell nucleus to the edge, and the cell is then called a Mott cell.

In viruses

Examples of viral inclusion bodies in animals are

Cytoplasmic eosinophilic (acidophilic)-
 Downie bodies in cowpox
 Negri bodies in rabies
 Guarnieri bodies in vaccinia, variola (smallpox)
 Paschen bodies in variola (smallpox)
 Bollinger bodies in fowlpox
 Molluscum bodies in Molluscum contagiosum
 Eosinophilic inclusion bodies in boid inclusion body disease

Nuclear eosinophilic (acidophilic)-
 Cowdry bodies type A in Herpes simplex virus and Varicella zoster virus
 Torres bodies in yellow fever
 Cowdry bodies type B in polio and adenovirus

Nuclear basophilic-
 Cowdry bodies type B in adenovirus
 "Owl's eye appearance" in cytomegalovirus
Both nuclear and cytoplasmic-
 Warthin–Finkeldey bodies in measles and HIV/AIDS

Examples of viral inclusion bodies in plants include aggregations of virus particles (like those for Cucumber mosaic virus) and aggregations of viral proteins (like the cylindrical inclusions of potyviruses). Depending on the plant and the plant virus family these inclusions can be found in epidermal cells, mesophyll cells, and stomatal cells when plant tissue is properly stained.

In bacteria
Polyhydroxyalkanoates (PHA) are produced by bacteria as inclusion bodies. The size of PHA granules are limited in E. coli, due to its small size. Bacterial cell's inclusion bodies are not as abundant intracellularly, in comparison to eukaryotic cells.

Isolation of proteins
Between 70% and 80% of recombinant proteins expressed E. coli are contained in inclusion bodies (i.e., protein aggregates). The purification of the expressed proteins from inclusion bodies usually require two main steps: extraction of inclusion bodies from the bacteria followed by the solubilisation of the purified inclusion bodies. Solubilisation of inclusions bodies often involves treatment with denaturing agents, such as urea or guanidine chloride at high concentrations, to de-aggregate the collapsed proteins. Renaturation follows the treatment with denaturing agents and often consists of dialysis and/or use of molecules that promote the refolding of denatured proteins (including chaotopic agents and chaperones).

Pseudo-inclusions
Pseudo-inclusions are invaginations of the cytoplasm into the cell nuclei, which may give the appearance of intranuclear inclusions. They may appear in papillary thyroid carcinoma.

Diseases involving inclusion bodies

Inclusion body diseases differ from amyloid diseases in that inclusion bodies are necessarily intracellular aggregates of protein, where amyloid can be intracellular or extracellular. Amyloid also necessitates protein polymerization where inclusion bodies do not.

Preventing inclusion bodies in bacteria

Inclusion bodies are often made of denatured aggregates of inactive proteins. Although, the renaturation of inclusion bodies can sometimes lead to the solubilisation and the recovery of active proteins, the process is still very empirical, uncertain and of low efficiency. Several techniques have been developed over the years to prevent the formation of inclusion bodies. These techniques include:

 The use of weaker promoters to slowdown the rate of protein expression
 The use of low copy number plasmids
 The co-expression of chaperone (such as GroES-GroEL and DnaK-DnaJ-GrpE)
 The use of specific E. coli strains such as (AD494 and Origami)
 Fusing the target protein to a soluble partner
 Lowering the expression temperature

See also
Adult polyglucosan body disease
Birbeck granules
Ferruginous body
JUNQ and IPOD
Maltose-binding protein
Nuclear bodies
Orthopoxvirus inclusion bodies
P-bodies
Reinke crystals
Stress granules

References

Biotechnology
Blood
Virology